The Niue Assembly or Niue Parliament is the legislature of Niue. It consists of 20 members; 14 representatives of the villages and 6 elected on a common island-wide roll. Members are directly elected by universal suffrage, and serve a three-year term. Niue follows the Westminster system of government, with the Premier elected by the Assembly and the Cabinet drawn from it.

History
The Assembly is descended from the Island Council established under the Cook Islands Act 1915.  This was disbanded in 1959 and reconstituted as the Assembly, which was successively granted greater control.  The Assembly assumed full law-making power within the constitution upon self-government in 1974.

The Assembly is physically located in Alofi.

Speaker of the Assembly
The Assembly is presided over by a Speaker, elected by its members from outside their ranks.  If a member of the Assembly is elected Speaker, they must resign their seat. The Speaker does not vote in proceedings, and does not enjoy a casting vote.

The current Speaker is Hima Douglas.

Elections

Elections are held under a simple plurality system, with electors in the fourteen villages electing one member per village by majority vote, and six members from a common roll. Electors must be New Zealand citizens, resident for at least three months, and candidates must have been electors, resident for twelve months.

Terms of the Niue Assembly
The Assembly is currently in its 16th term.  The 16th Assembly was elected at the 2017 elections.

Legislative procedures
The power of the Assembly to pass legislation is circumscribed by the constitution.  Any member may introduce a bill, but the Assembly may not proceed on bills dealing with financial matters without the consent of the Premier.  Bills affecting the criminal law or personal status, the public service or Niuean land may not proceed without a report from the Chief Justice, the Niue Public Service Commission, or an appropriate Commission of Inquiry respectively.

A bill becomes law when passed by the Assembly and certified by the Speaker. There is no Royal Assent.

See also
 List of speakers of the Niue Assembly

References

Niue
Politics of Niue
Political organisations based in Niue
Niue
1974 establishments in Niue